The Place de la République (known as the Place du Château d'Eau until 1879) is a square in Paris, located on the border between the 3rd, 10th and 11th arrondissements. Named after the First, Second and Third Republics, it contains a monument which includes a statue of the personification of France, Marianne.

The Métro station of République lies beneath the square, served by Line 3, Line 5, Line 8, Line 9 and Line 11. It is one of the network's main transfer points on the Rive Droite.

History and architecture
The square was originally called the Place du Château d'Eau, named after a huge fountain designed by Pierre-Simon Girard and built on the site in 1811. Émile de La Bédollière wrote that the water came from la Villette and that the fountain was "superb" in character. In 1867, Gabriel Davioud built a more impressive fountain in the square, which (like the first fountain) was decorated with lions. The square took its current shape as part of Baron Hausmann's vast renovation of Paris. Haussmann also built new barracks on the cities, to garrison troops useful in times of civil unrest.

At the center of the Place de la République is a  bronze statue of Marianne, the personification of the French Republic, "holding aloft an olive branch in her right hand and resting her left on a tablet engraved with Droits de l'homme (the Declaration of the Rights of Man and of the Citizen)." Marianne is surrounded with three statues personifying liberty, equality, and fraternity, the values of the French Republic. These statues also evoke the three medieval theological virtues. Also at the base is a lion guarding a depiction of a ballot box. The monument has been described as "an ordinary one, acceptable to a committee in the 1880s and inoffensively unarresting today."

The monument was created by the brothers Charles and Léopold Morice. Leopold executed the sculptural segments, while Charles executed the architectural segments. The monument was chosen as part of an art competition announced in early 1879 by the Paris City Council, which sought to create a "Monument to the French Republic" in honor of the 90th anniversary of the French Revolution, to be erected on the Place de la République. The Morice statue was chosen by the jury, but a "vociferous minority opinion among jury members claimed precedence for the second prize", the submission of Jules Dalou, who had just returned from exile in England. Dalou's statue, which was completely different in style, impressed the jury so much that it was decided in early 1880 to erect his monument to the Republic on the adjacent Place de la Nation. Two inauguration ceremonies for the Morice monument took place, the first on 14 July 1880 with a gypsum model, and the second on 14 July 1883 with the final version in bronze. The monument replaced the second fountain.

Paris mayor Bertrand Delanoë made a renovation of the Place de la République one of his campaign promises in the 2008 campaign for re-election. The project involved the transformation of the square from a "glorified roundabout" into a pedestrian zone, with 70% of the square's 3.4 hectares and surroundings roads being reserved for pedestrians. The Paris City Council allocated twelve million euros for renovating the square in 2010, and the project began the same year. The project was completed in 2013. The total cost of the project was 20.4 GBP, about 5 million GBP over budget. The renovation was a finalist for the European Prize for Urban Public Space. The pedestrian area now occupies "some two hectares in the sunniest part on the north-eastern side" while the "other third, to be used by vehicular traffic, is the shadier part on the south-western side." The statue of Marianne was cleaned of graffiti and footprints as part of the renovations.

After terrorist attacks against France in January 2015, crowds gathered in the square to mourn and express solidarity against the threat of Islamic extremism. The French Interior Ministry estimated that as many as 1.6 million people participated, making it the largest demonstration in modern French history. Crowds again rallied on the Place de la République following the November 2015 Paris attacks.

In 2016 the Nuit debout movement, which opposed the labour reforms of the El Khomri law, began from an occupation of the Place de la République. In April 2019, Yellow Vest demonstrators clashed with authorities in the square in their 23rd week of protests and dissatisfaction over President Macron's government, the weekend following the Notre-Dame de Paris fire.

Metro stations
The Place de la République is:
 It is served by lines 3, 5, 8, 9,  and 11.

Streets meeting at the Place de la République
Boulevard de Magenta
Rue Beaurepaire
Rue Léon-Jouhaux
Rue du Faubourg du Temple
Avenue de la République
Boulevard Voltaire
Boulevard du Temple
Passage du Vendôme
Rue du Temple
Boulevard Saint-Martin
Rue René Boulanger

References

Sources
Kathy Borrus, Five Hundred Buildings of Paris (Black Dog & Leventhal: 2003).
Eric Hazan, The Invention of Paris: A History in Footsteps (Verso: 2010; trans. David Fernbach).
Stephane Kirkland, Paris Reborn: Napoléon III, Baron Haussmann, and the Quest to Build a Modern City (Macmillan: 2013).
Sergiusz Michalski, Public Monuments: Art in Political Bondage 1870-1997 (Reaktion: 1998).
Marina Warner, Monuments & Maidens: The Allegory of the Female Form (University of California: 1985).

External links

Republique
Buildings and structures in the 3rd arrondissement of Paris
Buildings and structures in the 10th arrondissement of Paris
Buildings and structures in the 11th arrondissement of Paris
Liberty symbols
Sculptures of lions